Anfa is an arrondissement of Casablanca, in the Anfa district of the Casablanca-Settat region of Morocco. As of 2004 it had 95,539 inhabitants.

References

Arrondissements of Casablanca